Sutton Heath is a civil parish on the former site of RAF Woodbridge, in the East Suffolk district, in the county of Suffolk, England. The parish was formed on 1 April 2012 from part of the parish of Sutton. The new parish was created following petitioning by residents to Suffolk Coastal District Council who believed it was more urban than its surrounding area in Sutton and therefore had different needs.

Sutton Heath has a shop and primary school. The parish incorporates the military installation of MoD Woodbridge.

References

External links
 Sutton Heath Parish Council

Civil parishes in Suffolk
Suffolk Coastal